This article provides information on candidates who stood for the 1954 Australian federal election. The election was held on 29 May 1954. There was no election for the Senate.

By-elections, appointments and defections

By-elections and appointments
On 28 July 1951, Tony Luchetti (Labor) was elected to replace Ben Chifley (Labor) as the member for Macquarie.
On 28 July 1951, Percy Joske (Liberal) was elected to replace Thomas White (Liberal) as the member for Balaclava.
On 22 March 1952, Philip Lucock (Country) was elected to replace Jim Eggins (Country) as the member for Lyne.
On 18 October 1952, Keith Ewert (Labor) was elected to replace Rupert Ryan (Liberal) as the member for Flinders.
On 29 November 1952, Gough Whitlam (Labor) was elected to replace Bert Lazzarini (Labor) as the member for Werriwa.
On 20 December 1952, Harry Turner (Liberal) was elected to replace Billy Hughes (Liberal) as the member for Bradfield.
On 9 May 1953, Arthur Greenup (Labor) was elected to replace Sol Rosevear (Labor) as the member for Dalley.
On 29 August 1953, Frank Stewart (Labor) was elected to replace Dan Mulcahy (Labor) as the member for Lang.
On 29 August 1953, Dan Mackinnon (Liberal) was elected to replace Allan McDonald (Liberal) as the member for Corangamite.
On 19 December 1953, Ian Allan (Country) was elected to replace Thomas Treloar (Country) as the member for Gwydir.

Retiring Members

Country
 Bernard Corser MP (Wide Bay, Qld)

House of Representatives
Sitting members at the time of the election are shown in bold text. Successful candidates are highlighted in the relevant colour. Where there is possible confusion, an asterisk (*) is also used.

Australian Capital Territory

New South Wales

Northern Territory

Queensland

South Australia

Tasmania

Victoria

Western Australia

Summary by party 

Beside each party is the number of seats contested by that party in the House of Representatives for each state.

See also
 1954 Australian federal election
 Members of the Australian House of Representatives, 1951–1954
 Members of the Australian House of Representatives, 1954–1955
 List of political parties in Australia

References
Adam Carr's Election Archive - House of Representatives 1954

1954 in Australia
Candidates for Australian federal elections